Garhwal Football Club (also known as Garhwal Heroes FC) is an Indian professional football club based in New Delhi. The club lifted its first FD Senior Division league title in 1986, which became one of the most successful seasons in their history. In 2010, Garhwal FC became the first Delhi based club to enter into the quarter final of Durand Cup, prestigious and oldest knockout football club tournament in India. They also competed in the I-League 2nd Division.

History

Foundation
Garhwal Heroes FC was initially set up by Kesar Singh Negi as a platform for young players of the Garhwali community to compete locally in Delhi. As the club gained popularity, it was formally registered with the Football Delhi (formerly Delhi Soccer Association) in 1953. Since then, GHFC has regularly featured in the league championship organized by the Football Delhi (FD). One of the most memorable moments came in 1986, when GHFC were crowned the champions of the FD Senior Division. 
Unfortunately, the one and a half decades following the historic triumph saw GHFC beset by financial problems which resulted in the club being relegated to the A Division and then the B Division of the Delhi League. The club got a fresh lease of life when it was taken over by B. S. Negi and M. S. Patwal in 2001 following which the club gradually started its ascent once more. From the nadir of the B Division, the club gained promotion to A Division and then to the Senior Division in 2005. Since then, GHFC, backed by strong community support, has consistently delivered strong results in the Senior Division which culminated in reclaiming the lost glory by winning the FD Senior Division League once more in 2012–13.

In order to keep raising the bar, GHFC now has ambitions to play the I-League 2nd Division from 2013–2014 onwards. Always a community and youth-oriented club, GHFC entered into a historic partnership in 2013 with Bhaichung Bhutia Football Schools – the largest and most reputed football youth development setup in India and Delhi-NCR.

Garhwal FC era (2013–present)
In 2013, GHFC also won the Delhi leg of the Manchester United Premier Cup, which is a nationwide U-16 club competition. As GHFC tries to attain sustainability of its operations, the partnership will strengthen the club's youth development and scouting network.

In 2013, GHFC was rechristened as Garhwal Football Club (GFC) in order to fulfill the AFC Club Licensing Criteria laid down by the All India Football Federation (AIFF) – a step that would enable GFC to compete in the I-League – the highest level of professional football in the country. GFC brought about a major restructuring drive that would make it a complete club ready for the next generation. In addition to becoming an independent commercial entity as mandated by AIFF, GFC also set up a highly organized youth development system and a professional management team in order to be able to compete in the 2nd Division of the I-League. GFC has since been recognized as one of only 15 clubs that will compete in the 2nd Division I-League and the U-19 I League by the AIFF, on 7 June 2015. GFC finished runner up in All India Football Tournament in Pithoragarh, Uttarakhand.

In July 2021, Garhwal FC participated in the innagueal Delhi 2nd Division Qualifiers and moved through knockout stages from Group A.

Competitive seasons
2020 was Garhwal's one of the successful seasons when the club finished top of the 2019–20 2nd Division League Group A preliminary round and entered into the 2020 I-League Qualifiers, where they finished at the bottom.

Achievements
Apart from being champions of the Delhi League, other notable achievements in the past include winning the Delhi Women's League in 2011 and reaching the quarterfinals of the prestigious Durand Cup in 2010, beating the likes of Sporting Clube de Goa and JCT in the process.

Tradition

Historically, the Garhwal Kingdom in the Garhwal Himalayas was established by King Kanak Pal by integrating the 52 forts or "Garhs" in the region at a time when these forts were owned by several warring chieftains. This helped the kingdom to unite and flourish despite the hardships posed by the unforgiving terrain and extreme weather conditions. Unity and bravery of the Garhwalis were also instrumental in helping the Kingdom to withstand multiple invasions – firstly from the Mughals and then from the Gorkhas. These values of fighting against all odds to survive and succeed formed the basis of the club's philosophy when it was set up. Thus, Unity, Bravery, Victory (Ekta, Shaurya, Vijay) became the guiding principles of the club. The goal of the club is to promote community welfare by achieving sporting success in the field of football on the basis these principles.

Since its inception, GFC has always been a community-oriented club with most of its roster being local players. It enjoys unparalleled support within Delhi and Uttarakhand with over 5000 fans celebrating its victory in the Delhi League in 2012–13.

Club management

Other department

Youth team
Garhwal FC's U17 team competes in various regional and national youth tournaments, as well as Hero Youth League.

Honours

Domestic tournaments
Senior
FD Senior Division
Champions (3): 1986, 2012–13, 2018–19
Runners-up (2): 1990, 2010
Lal Bahadur Shastri Cup
Champions (1): 1980
Runners-up (2): 1983, 2006
Mohan Kumar Mangalam Football Tournament
Champions (1): 1988

Youth
FD U-18 Youth League
Third place (1): 2022–23

See also
 List of football clubs in India
 Sport in Delhi

References

External links

Team info at Global Sports Archive
Garhwal FC at the-aiff.com
 

Garhwal FC
Football clubs in Delhi
1953 establishments in India
Association football clubs established in 1953
I-League 2nd Division clubs